Lansing United is an American amateur soccer club based in East Lansing, Michigan. The club began its inaugural season in United Women's Soccer in Spring 2018. United also fielded a men's team in the National Premier Soccer League and the Premier Development League from 2014 to 2018.

History

Club Background
When Lansing United was accepted into the National Premier Soccer League in Fall of 2013, ideas for names were solicited from the Greater Lansing community, and Lansing United was chosen. The club motto is  “Pride, Passion and Unity” and is reflected in the team's logo, with the star representing pride, the flame representing passion, and the gear representing unity. The club also uses the Latin phrase “Coniunctis Viribus” which means “With Connected Strength.” The club produced its first-ever NWSL draftee at the 2020 NWSL Draft in University of Virginia center back and East Lansing native Zoe Morse who was taken in the second round by the Chicago Red Stars.

Inaugural UWS Season  (2018–present)
Beginning in May 2018, United will field a squad in the Midwest Division of United Women's Soccer.

Stadium 
Lansing United play their home matches at Archer Stadium located in the East Lansing Soccer Complex.

Year-by-year

Head coaches 
 Jason Crist (2018–present)

References

External links
 Official team site

Soccer clubs in Michigan
United Women's Soccer
2018 establishments in Michigan
Association football clubs established in 2018
Sports teams in Michigan
Women's soccer clubs in the United States
Women's sports in Michigan